Is It Friday Yet? is the fifth studio album by Canadian country music artist Gord Bamford. It was released on March 6, 2012 by Sony Music Canada. Bamford co-wrote and co-produced all thirteen tracks.

Track listing

Chart performance

Singles

References

2012 albums
Gord Bamford albums
Sony Music Canada albums
Albums produced by Byron Hill
Canadian Country Music Association Album of the Year albums